Baptist Bible College (BBC) is a private Baptist bible college in Springfield, Missouri. Founded in 1950, BBC focuses on training Christian professionals and ministers. It offers accredited associate, bachelor's, and master's degrees.

History
Baptist Bible College has its origins in a May 1950 meeting of Baptist ministers at the Texas Hotel in Fort Worth. In the summer of 1950 land was bought at the intersection of Summit Avenue and Kearney Street in Springfield, Missouri. This former  city park was turned into dormitories, which opened on September 5, 1950. From the founding until 1975, George Beauchamp Vick, pastor of the Temple Baptist Church of Detroit, Michigan (currently NorthRidge Church), was the president of the college.

Vick's executive vice president, W. E. Dowell Sr., became president for the following eight years. In 1983, A. V. Henderson led the school for three years. In 1986, Leland Kennedy presided over the institution for 15 years. In 2001, BBC received probationary accreditation from the North Central Association of Colleges and Schools. Mike Randall was installed as the fifth president on February 20, 2002. Accreditation was received in 2005, due in part to Randall's hard work but mostly due to the hard work of Russell Dell who served as Baptist Bible College's academic dean for many years. In 2008, Jim Edge was appointed to office, and resigned after three years. The Board of Trustees named Ron Sears as interim president and began the search for a new president. In 2012, by a unanimous vote of the trustees, Mark Milioni was named as the new president.

Following a decline from its peak enrollment of over 2,600 in the 1970s, Baptist Bible College has continued to see increased enrollment since 2013. In 2016 the school was placed on probation by its regional accreditor and has seen a decrease in enrollment. That probation was lifted in the spring of 2019.

Academics

Accreditation
Baptist Bible College was first accredited by the North Central Association of Colleges and Schools in 2001 and is also accredited by the Association for Biblical Higher Education (ABHE). Although the college was placed on probation by the Higher Learning Commission in 2016, it was removed from probation in 2019.

Financial information
Tuition is $450 per credit hour for undergraduate students and $450 per credit hour for graduate students, plus additional fees. Room and board costs are approximately $7,500 per year for students residing on-campus. The estimated total cost per undergraduate year before financial aid is $18,590.

Athletics
The Baptist Bible athletic teams are called the Patriots. The college is a member of the National Christian College Athletic Association (NCCAA), primarily competing as an independent in the Central Region of the Division I level.

Baptist Bible competes in seven intercollegiate varsity sports: Men's sports include baseball, basketball and golf; while women's sports include basketball, cross country, golf and volleyball. Former sports included men's soccer.

Men's basketball
The Patriots men's basketball team won the 2022 NCCAA Division I National Championship by defeating Lancaster Bible College 77–70.

Notable alumni
Jerry Falwell – Bachelor of Theology in 1956
Jerry Prevo – acting President of Liberty University

References

External links
 
 Official athletics website

Association for Biblical Higher Education
Baptist universities and colleges in the United States
Universities and colleges in Springfield, Missouri
Bible colleges
Educational institutions established in 1950
1950 establishments in Missouri